Chapulines, plural for chapulín, are grasshoppers of the genus Sphenarium that are commonly eaten in certain areas of Mexico. The term is specific to Mexico and Central America, and derives from the Nahuatl word chapolin  (singular) or chapolimeh  (plural).

They are collected only at certain times of year (from their hatching in early May through the late summer/early autumn). They are toasted on a comal. Often they are seasoned with garlic, lime juice, chilies and/or salt.

One of the regions of Mexico where chapulines are most widely consumed is Oaxaca, where they are sold as snacks at local sports events and are becoming revived among foodies. There is one reference to grasshoppers that are eaten in early records of the Spanish conquest, in early to mid 16th century.

Besides Oaxaca, chapulines are popular in areas surrounding Mexico City, such as Tepoztlán, Cuernavaca and Puebla. They may be eaten individually as a botana (snack) or as a filling, e.g. tlayuda filled with chapulines.  The Seattle Mariners successfully introduced chapulines as a novelty snack in their 2017 home games.

Health risks

In 2007, several American media reported concerns over lead contamination in products imported from Zimatlán, a municipality in Oaxaca, including chapulines.

Contaminated chapulines which were found for sale in California were also identified in samples from Zimatlán.

See also 
 
 
 
  (Sphenarium purpurascens), a grasshopper species found in Mexico and Guatemala

References

External links

Grasshoppers
Chapulines recipe

Oaxacan cuisine
Insects as food
Mesoamerican cuisine
Mexican cuisine